Huamo is a Chinese method of decorating specially shaped mantou. Huamo are a feature of the folk art of Shanxi and are often prepared for festivals such as Qingming. Wenxi County in Shanxi is particularly renowned for its huamo. Many shapes such as fish, guanmao, birds and dragons are used.

See also
Cake decorating

References

Breads
Chinese desserts
Vegetarian dishes of China
Steamed buns
Culture in Shanxi
Food and drink decorations